Al-Samawa SC, is an Iraqi sports club based in As-Samawa, Al-Muthanna, Iraq, which plays in the Iraq Division One, the second tier of the Iraqi football. The club's home stadium is As Samawah Stadium.

History
Al-Samawa Sports Club was founded in 1963 by Shamkhi Jabr Athab, the first president of the club was Hatem Rashid Deibes. In 1974 the team played in the Iraqi Premier League since the beginning of the league, they won sixth place. In the end of next season 1975–76 they came in last place and relegated to Iraq Division One. The club returned to play in the Premier League again in the 1999–2000 season, and continued for seven seasons until they relegated to Division One in the 2005–06 season. The club returned after a year to qualification for the Premier League again since the 2007–08 season, and after three seasons relegated to Division One in the 2009–10 season, but returned to play in the Premier League in 2015–16 season where qualified after winning the Iraqi First Division championship for 2014-15 season.

Current squad

First-team squad

Technical staff
{| class="toccolours"
!bgcolor=silver|Position
!bgcolor=silver|Name
!bgcolor=silver|Nationality
|- bgcolor=#eeeeee
|Manager:||Aqeel Ghani||
|- 
|Assistant manager:||Bariq Rasim||
|-
| Goalkeeping coach:||Khalid Aoda||
|-bgcolor=#eeeeee
| Fitness coach:||Majid Abdul-Hameed||
|-
| Technical director:||Ghalib Abdul Hussein||
|- bgcolor=#eeeeee
| Administrative director:||Ali Abdul Hussein||
|- 
| Team supervisor:||Saad Aziz Jabbar||
|- 
|U19 Manager:||Hmood Salih||
|- bgcolor=#eeeeee
|U16 Manager:||Ahmed Abdul Hussien||
|-

Managerial history
Since winning the Iraq Division One and returning to play in the Premier League in the 2015 season so far, the team has led twelve coaches.

  Ali Wahab 
  Mohammed Alosh 
  Khalid Aoda 
  Hassan Kamal 
  Sabah Abdul Hassan 
  Aqeel Ghani 
  Muneer Jaber 
  Hazim Saleh 
  Safaa Adnan 
  Ghalib Abdul Hussein 
  Maitham Dael-Haq 
  Samir Kadhim 
  Ghalib Abdul Hussein 
  Aqeel Ghani 
  Shaker Mahmoud 
  Samir Kadhim 
  Aqeel Ghani 
  Haider Hussien 
  Ali Jawad

Honours
Iraq Division One
Winners: 2014–15

References

External links
 Al-Samawa SC at Goalzz.com

1963 establishments in Iraq
Football clubs in Muthanna